Andreas Hoven (born 20 February 1998) is a Norwegian football player who plays as midfielder for Sogndal.

He is a son of the track and field athletes Anders Hoven and Anne-Beth née Espetvedt, and together with his brother Kristoffer Hoven he signed for Strømsgodset's first team in 2016.

References

External links

1998 births
Living people
Norwegian footballers
Eliteserien players
Norwegian First Division players
Strømsgodset Toppfotball players
Notodden FK players
Nest-Sotra Fotball players
Sogndal Fotball players
Association football midfielders
Norway youth international footballers
Norway under-21 international footballers